Kathleen Brown or Browne could refer to: 

Kathleen Brown (born 1945), American politician, member of the Brown political family of California
Kathleen M. Brown, American historian
Kathleen Margaret Brown, Northern Irish Anglican priest
Kathleen Browne (1876–1943), Irish politician
Kathleen Browne (artist) (1905–2007), New Zealander-English artist
Kathleen Campbell-Brown (1903–1996), Australian university lecturer

See also
Catherine Brown (disambiguation)
Kathie Browne (1930–2003), American actress